Robert Bryarly Gordon (August 6, 1855 – January 3, 1923) was a U.S. Representative from Ohio for two terms from 1899 to 1903.

Biography 
Born at St. Marys, Auglaize County, Ohio, Gordon attended the public schools.  He served as Postmaster of St. Marys from 1885 to 1889, as auditor of Auglaize County from 1890 to 1896, and served as delegate to the Democratic National Convention in 1896.

Gordon was elected as a Democrat to the Fifty-sixth and Fifty-seventh Congresses (March 4, 1899 – March 3, 1903).  He later engaged in the flour and grain business at St. Marys, Ohio.  He served as superintendent of the document room of the House of Representatives from 1911 to 1913, and as Sergeant at Arms of the House of Representatives from 1913 to 1919.  He died in Washington, D.C., and is interred in Elm Grove Cemetery, St. Marys, Ohio.

Sources

External links
 

1855 births
1923 deaths
Sergeants at Arms of the United States House of Representatives
People from St. Mary's, Ohio
Democratic Party members of the United States House of Representatives from Ohio